Henry Haynes (20 September 1834 – February 1892) was a Barbadian cricketer. He played in one first-class match for the Barbados cricket team in 1864/65.

See also
 List of Barbadian representative cricketers

References

External links
 

1834 births
1892 deaths
Barbadian cricketers
Barbados cricketers
People from Saint John, Barbados